Agatrix is a genus of sea snails, marine gastropod mollusks in the family Cancellariidae, the nutmeg snails.

Species
Species within the genus Agatrix include:

 Agatrix agassizii (Dall, 1889)
 Agatrix epomis (Woodring, 1928)
 Agatrix strongi (Shasky, 1961)
Species brought into synonymy 
 Agatrix deroyae Petit, 1970: synonym of Admetula deroyae (Petit, 1970)
 Agatrix nodosivaricosa Petuch, 1979: synonym of Nipponaphera nodosivaricosa (Petuch, 1979)

References

 Hemmen J. (2007). Recent Cancellariidae. Wiesbaden, 428pp

Cancellariidae